Hasanabad-e Kalej (also Romanized as Ḩasanābād-e Kalej and Ḩasanābād-e Kaleh; also known as Ḩasanābād) is a village in Basharyat-e Gharbi Rural District, Basharyat District, Abyek County, Qazvin Province, Iran. At the 2006 census, its population was 2,090, in 536 families.

References 

Populated places in Abyek County